The Making of Milwaukee is a 2006 television series by Milwaukee PBS. The series are based on John Gurda's book and is narrated by the author himself. It is an Emmy Award-winning documentary series.

See also 
 History of Milwaukee
 Milwaukee PBS

References

External links 
 The Official Website
 Milwaukee Public Television
 Milwaukee Public Television Friends

Mass media in Milwaukee